Aceh United Football Club was an Indonesian football club based in Bireuen, Aceh, on the island of Sumatra.

History
Aceh United was first formed in the city of Banda Aceh in 2010. At first, Aceh United followed the competition Liga Primer Indonesia. But because of the league dualism, the club was disbanded and in 2017 they started to rise again.

With Ansyari Lubis as the coach, they reached 3rd place in the 2017 Liga 3, and thus, won the promotion to Liga 2. They won the 3rd place after a 2–0 win over PSAD Balikpapan on 17 December 2017 at the Gelora Bumi Kartini Stadium, Jepara.

In 2019, the club merged with PS Timah BaBel to form BaBel United.

Jersey and Sponsorships
Aceh United home jersey is orange with green end-strip, whilst the away jersey is white with orange end-strip. The kit supplier for 2018 season is Calci. Other sponsors for 2018 season are: The Light of Aceh and Bank Aceh.

Supporters
Aceh United have a supporter community called the Poemeurah. The name is an Acehnese word means Sumatran elephant. Members of the Poemeurah get free entry ticket at the north tribune of Harapan Bangsa Stadium for Aceh United home matches.

Honours
 Liga 3
 Third-place: 2017
 Cawan Aceh Cup
 Winner: 2018

Past Seasons 

Key
 Div. = Name of Division Played
 Tie. = Tier level in Indonesian league pyramid at the time of competition
 Pos. = Position in league

Notes
 Liga Primer Indonesia was an Indonesian independent football league held only in 2011.
 The club did not compete in any league after Liga Primer Indonesia was suspended in 2011. Until in 2017 they started to compete again from Liga 3 as the lowest-tier league.

References

External links
  

Football clubs in Indonesia
Association football clubs established in 2010
2010 establishments in Indonesia
Association football clubs disestablished in 2019
Defunct football clubs in Indonesia